Zvezda SKS-94 is a super-light ejection system designed for low-speed light aircraft, including trainers, acrobatic, patrol, agricultural and other light aircraft relating to general aviation. It is designed and manufactured by NPP Zvezda.

History
Sukhoi Design Bureau issued in 1991 to NPP Zvezda requirements specifications for development of a super light pilot-rescue system to be used on sports planes. The system is now known under the designation SKS-94. The system was displayed in the 1995 Paris Air Show, and Su-31M became the world's first aerobatics aeroplane to be fitted with an ejection system.

Applications
The ejection seat has been installed in the following aircraft types:
Yakovlev Yak-152
Yakovlev Yak-52
Yakovlev Yak-54
Sukhoi Su-26
Sukhoi Su-29
Sukhoi Su-31
FMA IA 63 Pampa

References

External links
SKS-94

Ejection seats